Ms. Purple is a 2019 American drama film directed by Justin Chon. It was screened in the U.S. Dramatic Competition section at the 2019 Sundance Film Festival.

Plot
Kasie and Carey live in Koreatown in Los Angeles. Abandoned by their mother and brought up by their father, the siblings struggled with profound emotional wounds from the difficulty of the parental dynamic. Now, with their father on his death bed, the estranged Carey comes home to help Kasie care for him.

Cast
 Tiffany Chu as Kasie
 Teddy Lee as Carey
 Octavio Pizano as Octavio
 Jake Choi as Johnny
 James Kang as Young-Il
 Mark Krenik as Boozr
 Crystal Lee as Sora
 Alma Martinez as Juanita

Reception

Box office
Ms. Purple grossed an estimated $15,734 from the Landmark NuArt in Los Angeles in its opening weekend. It expanded to three more theaters and earned an estimated $13,650, with a per-theater average of $3,413. It later opened in the top 10 markets the weekend of September 20, 2019. It went on to gross $80,657 domestically.

The film was crowdfunded via Kickstarter. Chon raised $73,634 to make the film.

Critical response
On review aggregation website Rotten Tomatoes, the film holds an approval rating of 87% based on 45 reviews, with an average rating of 7.1/10. The website's critical consensus reads: "A finely layered drama with rich visal allure, Ms. Purple sifts sensitively through the emotional wreckage of a broken family." On Metacritic, the film has a weighted average score of 71 out of 100, based on 15 critics, indicating "generally favorable reviews". 

John DeFore of The Hollywood Reporter wrote: "dwells quietly in the limbo of those waiting for a loved one to die."

References

External links
 

2019 films
2019 drama films
2019 independent films
American drama films
American independent films
Asian-American drama films
Films about Korean Americans
Films set in Los Angeles
Films shot in Los Angeles
2010s English-language films
2010s American films